Calliphora coloradensis is a species of blow fly in the family Calliphoridae.

References

Further reading

 

Calliphoridae
Articles created by Qbugbot
Insects described in 1899